This is a list of bus operators in Vermont.

References

Bus transportation in Vermont
Vermont transportation-related lists